Donald R. Aldridge (born September 12, 1937) is a former member of the Arizona House of Representatives. He served eight terms in the House from January 1983 through January 1999, representing district 1.

References

Republican Party members of the Arizona House of Representatives
1937 births
Living people